WMUC-FM (90.5 MHz FM) is the student-run non-commercial radio station licensed to the University of Maryland in College Park, Maryland, broadcasting at 30 watts.  It is a freeform radio station staffed entirely by UMD students and volunteers.

Broadcast Coverage 
WMUC can be heard on 90.5 FM in College Park and Hyattsville, in parts of Washington, DC and Silver Spring, and many of the surrounding communities. It is also streamed on the internet at wmuc.umd.edu and through the WMUC Radio app.

History 
WMUC had its first beginning in 1942 when student-run Old Line Network began daily broadcasts. Gilbert Cullen, with the help of George Reynolds, built the first University of Maryland campus radio station. Broadcasts were limited to the campus, transmitted by carrier current, so the station did not require an FCC license to operate. This became the fifth student-run campus station on the east coast. However, the station shut down January 1943 when most of its technical personnel were enlisted in the armed forces. The station re-launched in January using the call letters WMUC. The first WMUC broadcast aired October 11, 1948, but was shut down three days later due to transmission issues. The station relocated from the Speech Department to Silvester Hall in spring 1950, but in the fall, relocated again to a renovated shower stall in Calvert Hall where it remained until 1953. In 1953, WMUC moved to the old Journalism building (better known as Temporary Building FF) in a low-lying area of campus called "the gulch," where it stayed for over 20 years. Finally, the station relocated to the third floor of South Campus Dining Hall in fall 1974, where it currently resides.

WMUC received its FM license for 88.1 MHz in 1979 after a two-year "FM or Bust" campaign, airing as a 10-watt FM station for the first time on September 10, 1979. It adopted the freeform format in 1982 so DJs could promote underground artists and music that is under-represented by commercial radio. The WMUC(AM) 650 remained Top-40 format.

WMUC(AM) gained credibility in the Washington, D.C. radio broadcasting job market, providing announcers and managerial talent to many local stations. Though primarily funded by student fees, it also generated revenue through advertising of local and national concerns. In this era, WMUC "acquired its first news network affiliation, saw Anne Edwards appointed as the first female station manager and, in 1965, was selected by the Intercollegiate Broadcasting System to receive the 'All-American College Radio Station' Award", as recounted in the University's archives. In the mid 70s, programming broadened to include shows aimed at black and minority students and promoting feminism.  Waning listenership and increasing maintenance of the campus-only carrier-current transmission system caused the shutdown of AM in 1999. In its place, the online service WMUC Digital was created.

In 2012, the University Libraries' establishment of the Digital Conversion and Media Reformatting Center (DCMR) facilitated the process of archiving and digitizing the station schedules, staff lists, policies, forms, flyers, zines, photos, awards, correspondence, reports, newspaper clippings, and manuals. The WMUC Collection is now a "permanent and growing part of the University Archives" and is available for public research. "Saving College Radio: WMUC Past, Present, and Future" was exhibited in Hornbake Library from September 2013 to July 2014.

WMUC-FM's original operation was on channel 201 (88.1 MHz). At the time, WJHU at Johns Hopkins University in Baltimore, MD also operated a 10-watt Class D station on the same frequency.  The two low-wattage stations did not interfere with each other to any noticeable extent.  Over time, the WJHU license was conveyed to the entity that is now WYPR(FM), Baltimore.  Because channel 201 was allotted to Baltimore as available for higher-class operation, WYPR(FM) increased power and added a directional signal toward the south.  With its transmitter site located only 45 kilometers from the WMUC-FM transmitter site, this resulted in decades of interference, even on the College Park campus.  (Class D FM stations are not protected from interference and must accept interference from higher-class full-service FMs.)  After a long search, a channel was secured on 90.5 MHz and Washington, DC area stations WETA(FM) and WCSP(FM) agreed that WMUC-FM could operate with only second-adjacent channel separation to each of those stations (fourth-adjacent separation is normally required).  This frequency change was made on July 25, 2022 and allowed freedom from extreme co-channel interference for the first time in more than 17 years.

Programming
WMUC-FM is true freeform radio, where the DJs themselves determine the programming of the station. An elected student Program Director assigns weekly time slots on the station to individual DJs, who are then responsible for programming, hosting, and promoting their respective shows. The schedule changes each semester, with the goal of offering a fresh perspective and diverse lineup of music and talk shows created by students at the University of Maryland.

In 2008, WMUC launched WMUC-2, now WMUC Digital, a separate internet-only radio station which, like WMUC-FM, features freeform music and talk programming.  Intended as a "proving ground" for new DJs, WMUC Digital also features programs which may not be appropriate for broadcast under FCC rules.

WMUC also has an active Sports department, which maintains its own website and internet stream at wmucsports.net. WMUC Sports features a regular schedule of talk radio shows as well as on-air play-by-play and color analysis of Maryland sporting events. Calling 10 different sports, WMUC Sports is the primary carrier of Maryland men's soccer, women's basketball, baseball, women's lacrosse, field hockey, and softball.

In the past, WMUC had an active News department, which was integrated with the former Radio Television and Film department at the University of Maryland.  WMUC's news programming is now student run. The programming is divided into two segments: Weekly Roundup, the flagship news show featuring original reporting on top campus, national and DMV area news; and Drop the Pop, the featured talk show covering all things pop culture, politics, entertainment and more.

Live music
WMUC has a weekly live music program called Third Rail Radio (named after the electrically charged third rail of the DC Metro system), started in 1996 by Eric Speck. Third Rail Radio hosts many local and traveling independent bands and musicians. In 2004, the program produced a compilation CD of artists who have appeared on the program.

In addition to Third Rail Radio, there are many in-studio performances. In the past, these have included Louis Armstrong, Linda Ronstadt, The Kingston Trio, Don McLean, the Ramones, Duran Duran, and Elliott Smith. Recently, Beach House, Future Islands, Logic, Matt & Kim, King Tuff, Kurt Vile, Vivian Girls, Alvvays, Surfer Blood, and Mitski have performed at WMUC.

Notable alumni

 Bonnie Bernstein, sportscaster
 John Davis, drummer of Q And Not U, singer in Georgie James and Title Tracks
 Mark Davis, radio talk show host, KSKY-AM Dallas-Ft. Worth, columnist, Dallas Morning News
 Connie Chung, TV news anchor
 Len Elmore, sportscaster and former Maryland and NBA basketball player
 Jeff Krulik, documentary Film Director (Heavy Metal Parking Lot)
 Aaron McGruder, creator of The Boondocks comic strip and TV show
 Mark Robinson, indie rock musician and founder of TeenBeat Records and the band Unrest
 Peter Rosenberg, American radio disc jockey and television show host 
 Erin Smith, guitarist of Bratmobile

References

External links
WMUC Website

WMUC records at the University of Maryland Libraries

University of Maryland, College Park
MUC-FM
MUC-FM
Radio stations established in 1950
1950 establishments in Maryland